Crewe Alexandra Ladies Football Club is a women's football club that plays in the tier five Premier Division of the North West Women's Regional Football League, and is associated with Crewe Alexandra F.C. The club currently has three teams – First Team/Reserve Squad/Under 18's – all of which train at The Alexandra Soccer Centre. The first team currently play their home matches at the Cumberland Arena, on Thomas Street in Crewe, on Sunday afternoons.

History
The original Crewe Ladies joined the North West Women's Regional Football League in 1985 and folded on 14 February 1993 with their season incomplete. Before the 1999–2000 season, Crewe Alexandra Ladies FC were elected into the same league but they also disbanded. This was on 28 August 2001, after just two seasons in Division two South.

In 2000–01, a new club called Crewe Vagrants was formed, playing in the West Midlands Regional Football League. They won the Premier Division in 2002–03 with 58 points and moved into the (then) tier three Midland Combination. Success continued with a second championship in 2005–06, the season in which the club became Crewe Alexandra. They spent two seasons in the National League North (tier three), with a highest placing of 4th in 2006–07, before being relegated back to the Midland Combination. Currently (2021–22 season), they are playing in the Premier Division (tier five) of the North West Women's Regional Football League.

The team's best season in the Women's FA Cup has been a fourth round appearance in 2007–08. In the Cheshire County Cup, they have been finalists on three occasions and won the trophy once, in 2004–05.

In 2012–13, the Alex won silverware in the shape of the NWWRFL Plate by beating Kendal Ladies 7–1 in the final played at The Pavilions in Runcorn. In the same season, the club also established a Development Squad, playing in the Cheshire Women's & Youth Football League to enhance the playing squad.

The club's best known player is Kerry Davis, a prolific striker who scored a then record 44 goals in 82 appearances for England (1982–1998). Her record was beaten in February 2012, when Kelly Smith scored her 45th goal while playing against Finland in the Cyprus Cup.

Staff

Chairman: Ray Walker

Treasurer / Club Captain: Katie Nuttall

Secretary: Bev Lambourne

Club Welfare Officer: Bev Lambourne

First Team Manager: Matt Fisher

First Team Assistant Manager: Emma Lambourne

First Team Coaches: Christopher Lloyd

First Team Goalkeeper Coach: James Brown

Reserve Team Manager: Micky Beamon

Reserve Team Assistant Manager: Matt Halliwell

Under 18's (EDS) Manager: Mike Jansinski

Under 18's Coach: Chris Lewis

Under 18's Coach: Jamie Mellor

References

External links
 Crewe Alexandra Ladies FC Official Website

Crewe Alexandra F.C.
FA Women's National League teams
Women's football clubs in England